Naakaa (Nepali:नाका , English:Border) is a 2018 Nepalese drama crime film, directed by Amit Shrestha, written by Arjun Karki (screenplay) and Abhishek Subedi and made under the banner of Media Port. The film stars Bipin Karki, Thinley Lhamo, Robin Tamang and Ghanashyam Joshi in the lead roles. The film is set in Nepal-China border (around Bahrabise) film tells the story of human trafficking.

Plot 
Goldie (Bipin Karki) is local goon in Bahrabise who is in need of extra cash. One day he gets a call from another goon/business man to help a girl to cross her through Nepalese border to India. But he faces a lot of challenges while transporting her.

Cast 
Source: Rotten Tomatoes

 Bipin Karki as Goldie
 Thinley Lhamo as Sonam
 Ghanashyam Joshi as Shital
 Ram Bhajan Kamat as Ganesh
 Sajan Thapa Magar as Maadey
 Shiva Mukhiya as Lakpa
 Keshav Rai as Khakurel
 Abhishek Subedi as Medical owner
 Robin Tamang as Lata Bob

Soundtrack

References

External links 

 

2010s Nepali-language films
2018 films
Nepalese crime films